Sogeram may refer to:
 the Sogeram River of Papua New Guinea
 the Sogeram languages, named after the river